Liu Sheng-yi (born 21 November 1995) is a Taiwanese international footballer who plays as a midfielder for Tatung.

International career
Liu made his international debut in a 2–0 away loss to Cambodia, replacing Lin Che-yu in the 77th minute.

Career statistics

International

References

External links
 

1995 births
Living people
Taiwanese footballers
Chinese Taipei international footballers
Association football midfielders